Perseapicroside is any one of several chemical compounds isolated from certain plants, notably Persea mexicana.  They can be seen as derivatives of the triterpene hydrocarbon cucurbitane, more specifically from cucurbitacin F.

They include
 Perseapicroside A, from Persea mexicana.

References 

Triterpenes